The  Common University Entrance Test (CUET), earlier known as Central Universities Common Entrance Test (CUCET) is an all-India test being organized by National Testing Agency for admission to various Undergraduate, Integrated, Postgraduate, Diploma, Certification courses and Research Programmes in 45 Central Universities of India. It is also accepted by number of other State Universities and Deemed universities in India.

History
CUCET was first conducted to admission for seven central universities for 1,500 seats in 41 undergraduate, postgraduate and integrated courses from 2010. The application form was filled up through CUCET-2010 which held on 19 and 20 June 2010 in about 30 examination centres spread across the country. From its inception in 2010 till 2020, the CUCET was conducted by the Central University of Rajasthan for 12 Central Universities. The National Testing Agency took over the conduct of these exams in 2021. In 2022, as a part of National Education Policy 2020, CUET is introduced as revamped version of CUCET making it compulsory for all 43 central universities to adopt it.

Exam pattern and structure
All Question Papers are MCQ based organized into different parts.

For UG programmes 
As per the latest CUET updates 2022, the CUET entrance test 2022 will now be having four sections:

 Section IA – 13 Languages
 Section IB – 19 Languages
 Section II  –  27 Domain-specific Subjects
 Section III – General Test

The CUET 2022 consist of language test, domain-specific papers, and the general test. Candidates can opt for combination of at most 2 languages and 6 domain-specific subject or 3 languages and 5 domain-specific tests. CUET entrance test 2022 will now be conducted in two slots. The duration of first slot is 45 to 195 minutes and the duration of the second slot is 45 to 225 minutes.

Marking scheme includes 5 marks for each correct answer and 1 mark will be deducted for each wrong response.

For PG Programmes 
CUET PG will have more 72 test papers for various courses. The complete mapping of test paper code versus course and university is provided by NTA in the information brochure.

For RP programmes 

 Part A: Language, general awareness, mathematical aptitude, analytical skills and Research Methodology-consisting of 50 MCQs 
 Part B: Domain Knowledge-consisting of 50 MCQs

Negative marking
For UG & PG Programmes, negative marking scheme is followed with a deduction of 0.25 marks for each wrong answer. However, the negative marking is not followed for research programmes.

Application fees 
Only online applications are accepted for CUCET-2022 and application fees for various categories are listed below.

Participating universities

CUET-UG 
Admission in the following universities is done through CUET-UG in 2022 (only undergraduate and integrated masters degrees)-

CUET-PG 
Admission in the following universities is done through CUET-PG in 2022 (only masters degrees and post graduate diplomas)-

See also

 Joint Entrance Examination – Main
 National Eligibility cum Entrance Test (disambiguation) 
 Graduate Aptitude Test in Engineering

References

External links
 Central Universities Common Entrance Test -  Official website
 National Testing Agency (NTA) - Official website

Central universities in India
Standardised tests in India